Gdańsk is a city in northern Poland.

Gdańsk may also refer to several places:
Gdańsk Bay, the bay in the Baltic Sea adjoining the port of Gdańsk and stretching to Kaliningrad
Gdańsk County, a small administrative area next to but not including the city of Gdańsk
Gdańsk Pomerania, a region of Pomerania more commonly called "Eastern Pomerania"
Gdańsk Voivodeship (disambiguation)
 Gdańsk Voivodeship (1945–1975)
 Gdańsk Voivodeship (1975–1998)
Gdańsk (parliamentary constituency), a parliamentary constituency in Poland
Lechia Gdańsk, a football club based in Gdańsk

See also
 Danzig (disambiguation)